Austrumdalsvatnet is a lake in the municipality of Bjerkreim in Rogaland county, Norway.

See also
List of lakes in Norway

References

Bjerkreim
Lakes of Rogaland